Adam Bertocci (born August 18, 1982) is an American filmmaker based in a suburb of New York City called Bronxville, New York.

Filmography

Two Gentlemen of Lebowski
On January 6, 2010, Bertocci posted "Two Gentlemen of Lebowski", a melding of The Big Lebowski with the language and writing style of William Shakespeare. A sold-out off-off-Broadway production of the play ran from March 18 to April 4. It is now published by Simon & Schuster in paperback.

References

External links
Official site
Guy in his Basement Productions

1982 births
American male screenwriters
Film directors from New York City
Living people
People from Bronxville, New York
Writers from New York City
Screenwriters from New York (state)